The 1969–70 Scottish Cup was in the 85th season of Scotland's most prestigious football knockout competition. The Cup was won by Aberdeen who defeated Celtic in the final.

First preliminary round

Second preliminary round

Replay

First round

Replay

Second round

Quarter-finals

Semi-finals

Final

See also
1969–70 in Scottish football
1969–70 Scottish League Cup

Scottish Cup seasons
1969–70 in Scottish football
Scot